The 1818 Illinois gubernatorial election was the first election for governor in Illinois history. Shadrach Bond was the only serious candidate and won almost unanimously.

Results

1818
Illinois
Gubernatorial
September 1818 events